Beaufortia burbidgeae, commonly known as column beaufortia, is a plant in the myrtle family, Myrtaceae and is endemic to Southwest Australia. It is a shrub with crowded, needle-shaped leaves and mostly red, or red and green flowers on the ends of the branches from spring to early summer.

Description

The flowers are arranged in heads on the ends of the branches and on short side branches. The flowers have 5 sepals, 5 petals and 5 bundles of stamens. The stamen bundles are deep red at their bases and pale green or pink on the ends,  and hairy on the inner surface.

Taxonomy and naming
Beaufortia burbidgeae was first formally described in 2016 by Andrew A. Burbidge and the description was published in Nuytsia. The specific epithet ("burbidgeae") honours Nancy Tyson Burbidge, the aunt of the author.

Distribution and habitat
Column beaufortia grows in or near laterite on hills in heath and woodland, occasionally in sand. It occurs between Brookton, Corrigin and Boolanelling Nature Reserve in the Avon Wheatbelt bioregion in south-western Western Australia.

Conservation
Beaufortia burbidgeae  is classified as "Priority Three" by the Western Australian Government [[Department of Biodiversity, Conservation and Attractions]], meaning that it is poorly known and known from only a few locations but is not under imminent threat.

References

burbidgeae
Plants described in 2016
Endemic flora of Western Australia